The Lingnan Fine Arts Museum of the Academia Sinica is an art museum in Nangang District, Taipei, Taiwan.

History
The museum was established in June 2002 by the Academia Sinica after receiving various art works from inside and outside of Taiwan.

Exhibitions
The museums features the first professional archive of Lingnan paintings in Taiwan, famous for its innovation in modern Chinese art history. Overall it has more than 120 art works from notable artists.

Transportation
The museum is accessible within walking distance south from Taipei Nangang Exhibition Center Station of the Taipei Metro.

See also
 List of museums in Taiwan
 Academia Sinica

References

External links
  

2002 establishments in Taiwan
Art museums established in 2002
Art museums and galleries in Taiwan
Museums in Taipei